Joanna Williams may refer to:
Jo Williams (speed skater), British short-track skater
Joanna Williams (author), British author and commentator